Deactivation may refer to;

Protein denaturation, the process of disrupting the structure of proteins or nucleic acids
Drug metabolism
Sterilization (microbiology), the process of killing or deactivating all life and other biological agents, rendering them unable to cause disease, function, or replicate